Season 1997–98 was an unqualified disaster for Hibs, as the club was relegated to the First Division by finishing bottom of the Premier Division. There was also disappointment in the cup competitions, as the club were beaten by First Division club Raith Rovers in the Scottish Cup, and Dundee United in the League Cup. Manager Jim Duffy was sacked and replaced by Alex McLeish midway through the season.

League season 
Hibs got off to a good start to the season, winning 2–1 against Celtic on the opening day, with Chic Charnley scoring a memorable winning goal. The season "rapidly turned into a nightmare", however. With the club four points adrift at the bottom of the league, manager Jim Duffy was sacked after a 6–2 defeat by Motherwell. Alex McLeish was hired as Duffy's replacement, but he was unable to save the club from relegation to the First Division.

Results

Final table

Scottish League Cup

Results

Scottish Cup

Results

Transfers

Players In

Players Out

Loans In

Loans Out

Player stats 

During the 1997–98 season, Hibs used 32 different players in competitive games. The table below shows the number of appearances and goals scored by each player.

|}

See also
List of Hibernian F.C. seasons

Notes

External links 
Hibernian 1997/1998 results and fixtures , Soccerbase

Hibernian F.C. seasons
Hibernian